The Chico State Wildcats (also CSU Chico Wildcats and Cal State Chico Wildcats) are the athletic teams that represent California State University, Chico, located in Chico, California, in NCAA Division II intercollegiate sports. The Wildcats compete as an associate member of the California Collegiate Athletic Association for all 13 varsity sports. Since 1998, Chico State’s athletic teams have won 99 NCAA Championship berths, 40 CCAA titles, 24 West Region titles and 15 National titles. The school finished third in the 2004–2005 NACDA Director's Cup.

Varsity sports

Baseball
The Chico State baseball team plays at the 4,100–seat Nettleton Stadium, known as Ray Bohler Field until its 1997 renovation. The Wildcats won the NCAA Division II national title in 1997 and 1999, and was runner-up in 2002 and 2006; all four appearances in the finals were under head coach Lindsay Meggs. The head coach since 2007 is Dave Taylor. Big Blue Bird is the 2019 All Star.

Softball
The Wildcats softball team won the first AIAW Division III national championship in 1980, led by pitcher Kathy Arendsen.

Men's soccer
The men's soccer reached the Division II College Cup final in 2003, losing 2–1 to Lynn University.

Championships

Appearances
The Chico State Wildcats competed in the NCAA Tournament across 13 active sports (6 men's and 7 women's) 220 times at the Division II level.

 Baseball (20): 1978, 1987, 1996, 1997, 1998, 1999, 2000, 2002, 2004, 2005, 2006, 2007, 2008, 2010, 2012, 2013, 2014, 2016, 2017,  2018
 Men's basketball (14): 1958, 1974, 1981, 1991, 1992, 1993, 2004, 2005, 2012, 2013, 2014, 2015, 2016, 2017
 Women's basketball (13): 1987, 1988, 1996, 2003, 2004, 2005, 2006, 2007, 2008, 2010, 2012, 2013, 2014
 Men's cross country (24): 1969, 1972, 1973, 1995, 1999, 2000, 2001, 2002, 2003, 2004, 2005, 2006, 2007, 2008, 2009, 2010, 2011, 2012, 2013, 2014, 2015, 2016, 2017, 2018
 Women's cross country (21): 1997, 1998, 2000, 2001, 2002, 2003, 2004, 2005, 2006, 2007, 2008, 2009, 2010, 2011, 2012, 2013, 2014, 2015, 2016, 2017, 2018
 Men's golf (17): 1963, 1966, 1967, 1968, 1969, 1971, 1973, 1974, 1977, 2003, 2004, 2005, 2010, 2012, 2014, 2015, 2016
 Women's golf (1): 2009
 Men's soccer (13): 1972, 1976, 1977, 1978, 1980, 1981, 1986, 1992, 2003, 2010, 2011, 2013, 2018
 Women's soccer (8): 1992, 2004, 2005, 2007, 2009, 2011, 2017, 2018
 Softball (12): 1982, 1983, 1984, 2002, 2005, 2010, 2011, 2012, 2015, 2016, 2017, 2018
 Men's outdoor track and field (45): 1964, 1965, 1966, 1967, 1969, 1971, 1973, 1974, 1976, 1977, 1981, 1982, 1983, 1984, 1986, 1987, 1988, 1989, 1990, 1991, 1992, 1993, 1994, 1996, 1997, 1999, 2000, 2001, 2002, 2003, 2004, 2005, 2006, 2007, 2008, 2009, 2010, 2011, 2012, 2013, 2014, 2015, 2016, 2017, 2018
 Women's outdoor track and field (27): 1982, 1984, 1986, 1989, 1991, 1993• 1994, 1999, 2000, 2001, 2002, 2003, 2004, 2005, 2006, 2007, 2008, 2009, 2010, 2011, 2012, 2013, 2014, 2015, 2016, 2017, 2018
 Women's volleyball (5): 1992, 2006, 2007, 2008, 2016

Team
The Wildcats of Chico State earned 6 NCAA championships at the Division II level.

 Men's (6)
Baseball (2): 1997, 1999
Golf (1): 1966
Swimming and diving (3): 1973, 1974, 1976 

Results

Chico State won 1 national championship at the Division III level.

 Men's swimming and diving: 1975

Below is one national championship that were not bestowed by the NCAA:

 Softball – Division III (1): 1980 (AIAW)

Below are five national club team championships:

 Women's rugby: 2001, 2018 (USA Rugby)
 Co-ed wakeboarding: 2010, 2012 (USA Wakeboarding) // 2012 (College Wake)

Individual
Chico State had 59 Wildcats win NCAA individual championships at the Division II level.

At the NCAA Division III level, Chico State garnered 6 individual championships.

Former varsity sports

Football
Chico State ended its football program in 1997, citing rising insurance costs, in addition to an increased bias in favor of other athletic programs.

College Football Hall of Fame

Swimming & diving
CSU Chico won the NCAA Division II national championships in men's swimming and diving in 1973, 1974 and 1976. The program was eliminated several years after the 1976 season.

Other sports

Rugby
Chico State's team plays college rugby in Division I-AA in the California Conference, playing alongside Fresno State, Stanford, San Jose State, UNR, and Sacramento State.

In 2001, the women's rugby team won a Division I national championship.

In 2019, the men's rugby team won the Pacific West Conference and went on to the Division I-AA national championship game.

References

External links